Livinia Helen Nixon (19 March 1975) is an Australian television presenter and actress.

Nixon is the chief weather presenter for Nine News Melbourne.

Career

Nixon began her television career in 1995 in an advert for Physical skim milk then joined GTV-9 in 1997. She appeared on the children's show Plucka's Place in 1997, before moving to the iconic Australian show Hey Hey It's Saturday as co-host, from 1997 until the show's cancellation in late 1999. She has also worked in radio on Nova 100 in Melbourne and hosted the drive shift on TT FM with Ed Phillips for 18 months. It was during this time that she developed her on-air rapport with Phillips, which led to them to host the revamped version of Sale of the Century called Temptation. She was on this version's entire run from 2005 until early 2009.

Nixon has also appeared on the Today, Carols by Candelight, Micallef Tonight, co-hosted Weekend Today, Things To Try Before You Die, co-hosted the Logies Red Carpet Arrivals (2008–2012) and co-hosted Test Australia: The National IQ Test with Eddie McGuire. She has filed stories for Getaway from Switzerland, Germany, the Netherlands, Samoa, Japan, France, India and around Australia.

In 2009, Nixon appeared in both Hey Hey It's Saturday reunion specials. The popularity of the specials led to the revival of Hey Hey It's Saturday in April the following year, in which Nixon resumed her role as co-host.

Nixon has been the chief weekday weather presenter for Nine News Melbourne since 2004.

In 2011, Livinia replaced Jaynie Seal as weather presenter on Nine Afternoon News. The national edition of Nine Afternoon News was axed in 2017 and replaced by local statewide editions. She began presenting the weather on Nine Afternoon News Melbourne.

In July 2020, Nixon joined Nine Radio to host weekend breakfast across 2UE 954, Magic 1278, 4BH 882 and 6GT DAB+.

In November 2020, Nine announced that Nixon will host Carols by Candelight with David Campbell. However, due to COVID–19 border restrictions, it was announced she would be presenting with Eddie McGuire.

Education
Nixon was educated at Lauriston Girls' School as well as Deakin University. She has also completed a Graduate Diploma in Applied Science at Melbourne University.

Personal life
She grew up in the affluent Melbourne suburb of Toorak.

Nixon is an ambassador for the Juvenile Diabetes Foundation and World Vision. She also travelled to parts of Thailand with World Vision after the tsunami in December 2004.

Nixon is married and has two sons.

References

External links

Nine News presenters
Australian television actresses
Living people
Deakin University alumni
University of Melbourne alumni
Television personalities from Melbourne
Australian women television journalists
1975 births
People educated at Lauriston Girls' School
People from Toorak, Victoria